Illinois Revenue Amendment may refer to:

 Illinois Revenue Amendment (1952)
 Illinois Revenue Amendment (1956)
 Illinois Revenue Amendment (1966)